Shwetvarna is a mountain of the Garhwal Himalaya in Uttarakhand India.The elevation of Shwetvarna is  and its prominence is . It is 111th joint highest located entirely within the Uttrakhand. Nanda Devi, is the highest mountain in this category. It lies 1.2 km SSE of Chaturbhuj  its nearest higher neighbor and it is 1.2 km SSW of Sudarshan Parbat . It lies 3 km NW of Shyamvarn .

Climbing history
An Indo-French Expedition of eleven member team seven Indian and four French attempted many peaks around Swetvarn glacier. Some of the members attempted Swetvarn on 25 May 1981 and reached within 300 ft of the summit through the east ridge. C. D. Danthi, Jacques Giraud, Kanu Pomal and Lakhpa Tsering had to return because of mixed terrain ahead.

Neighboring and subsidiary peaks
neighboring or subsidiary peaks of Swetvarn:
 Chirbas Parbat 
 Matri 
 Sudarshan Parbat 
 Kalidhang 
 Yogeshwar:

Glaciers and rivers
On the east side lies Swetvarn Glacier which joins Raktvarn Glacier and Raktvarn drain itself near Gomukh beside Gangotri Glacier and part of Bhagirathi river. Bhagirathi River comes out From the snout of Gangotri Glacier. Bhagirathi joins the Alaknanda River the other main tributaries of river Ganga at Dev Prayag and called Ganga there after.

See also

 List of Himalayan peaks of Uttarakhand

References

Mountains of Uttarakhand
Six-thousanders of the Himalayas
Geography of Chamoli district